"Let It Bleed" is a song by the English rock band the Rolling Stones. It was written by Mick Jagger and Keith Richards and is featured on the 1969 album of the same name, the first example of a Rolling Stones title track. It was released as a single in Japan in February 1970.

Composition 
The song opens with a slide piece and quickly moves into a solo acoustic guitar capo on the 3rd fret strumming the chords of A, D and E before bass, drums and piano join in, respectively. Wyman's autoharp can be heard somewhat faintly during the first verse with noticeable 'ping' sounds coming from it around the 0:40-0:50 mark but it is mostly inaudible throughout the track after the 0:55 ('she said my breasts') minute mark.

Reception 
The lyrics include a number of drug and sexual references, including an invitation for "coke and sympathy," a reference to a "junkie nurse" and Jagger's suggestions that we all need someone to "bleed on," "cream on" and "cum on" them. However, to Allmusic critic Richie Unterberger, the song is mainly about "emotional dependency," with Jagger willing to accept a partner who wants to lean "on him for emotional support."

Unterberger also asserts that "Let It Bleed" may be "the best illustration" of the way the Rolling Stones make "a slightly sloppy approach work for them rather than against them." He also praises Jagger's vocals, stating the song represents "one of his best vocals, with a supremely lazy approach that seems to be both affectionate and mocking at the same time."

Live performances 
The song was played for the first time live at the Sir Morgan's Cove club in Worcester, Massachusetts on 14 September 1981, before being performed at every show on the 1981 U.S. Tour and the 1982 Tour of Europe. Ever since the song has been performed from time to time in concert. It appears in the  Hal Ashby-directed concert film 'Let's Spend the Night Together' and on the live albums 'From The Vault: Hampton Coliseum (Live In 1981) [December 18, 1981]' and 'Let It Bleed (Live At Wembley ‘82) [June 25. 1982]'.

Personnel
Ian Stewart plays piano on this track (his only appearance on the album) while Bill Wyman plays autoharp.
Mick Jaggervocals
 Keith Richardsguitar, slide guitar
 Bill Wymanbass guitar, autoharp
 Charlie Wattsdrums
 Ian Stewartpiano

References

The Rolling Stones songs
1969 songs
Songs written by Jagger–Richards
Song recordings produced by Jimmy Miller
1970 singles
London Records singles
Songs about drugs